Oleg Vladislavovich Chiritso (Олег Владиславович Чирицо, also transliterated Chiritsa, born 1 April 1964) is a Belarusian male former weightlifter, who competed in the 99 kg category and represented Belarus at international competitions. He won the bronze medal in the clean & jerk at the 1995 World Weightlifting Championships lifting 217.5 kg. He participated at the 1996 Summer Olympics.

References

External links
 
 
 

1964 births
Living people
Belarusian male weightlifters
Olympic weightlifters of Belarus
Weightlifters at the 1996 Summer Olympics
World Weightlifting Championships medalists
Sportspeople from Minsk